Mikkjal Kjartansson Thomassen (born 12 January 1976) is a Faroese football manager and former footballer that played 13 times for the Faroe Islands national football team.

Playing career 
During his playing career Thomassen represented HB Tórshavn, B36 Tórshavn, B68 Toftir and EB/Streymur.

His last international match was a qualifier for the 2010 FIFA World Cup at home against Austria on 11 August 2008. He was substituted after 37 minutes due to injury, but had the satisfaction of seeing his teammates earning a 1–1 draw.

Managerial career 
Thomassen was manager for HB Tórshavn's women's team in 1995, the team won the Faroese championship that season. From 2009 until 2013 he was the manager of B36 Tórshavn. The club won the Faroese championship in 2011 managed by Mikkjal Thomassen and John Petersen.

Thomassen has been the manager of KÍ Klaksvík in the Faroese Premier Division since 2015. During this period he has won the Faroese championship in 2019. The club was runner-up in 2016, 2017. In 2016 he won the Faroe Islands Cup with KÍ. In 2020 KÍ won the Faroe Islands Super Cup for the first time.

On 24 September 2020 under the management of Mikkjal Thomassen, KÍ became the first Faroese club to reach the play-offs in Europa League, when they won 6-1 on Tórsvøllur in Tórshavn against the Georgian champions FC Dinamo Tbilisi. It was also the biggest victory for a Faroese club in European tournaments.

On 1 November 2022 he was announced as the manager of Norwegian football club Fredrikstad FK.

References

1976 births
Living people
Faroese footballers
Faroe Islands international footballers
Havnar Bóltfelag players
B36 Tórshavn players
B68 Toftir players
EB/Streymur players
Association football midfielders
Faroese football managers
B36 Tórshavn managers
KÍ Klaksvík managers
Fredrikstad FK managers
Expatriate football managers in Norway